Events from the year 1690 in the Kingdom of Scotland.

Incumbents 
 Monarch – William II and Mary II
 Secretary of State – Lord Melville

Law officers 
 Lord Advocate – John Dalrymple
 Solicitor General for Scotland – ??

Judiciary 
 Lord President of the Court of Session – Lord Stair
 Lord Justice General – Lord Lothian
 Lord Justice Clerk – Lord Stair, then Lord Cessnock

Events 
 4 January – Glasgow is re-chartered as a royal burgh with power to elect its own officials
 25 April – the Parliament of Scotland passes an Act to abolish episcopy in the presbyterian Church of Scotland. The Anglican Episcopal Church in Scotland continues as a separate denomination, retaining bishops. The Reformed Presbyterian Church of Scotland also forms
 30 April–1 May – defeat at the Battle of Cromdale effectively ends the Jacobite uprising
 9 October – Royal Navy frigate HMS Dartmouth is wrecked in the Sound of Mull while on a mission to persuade the MacLeans of Duart to sign articles of allegiance to William III and Mary II
 Rev. Robert Kirk produces An Biobla Naomhtha, a pocket Bible translation into Scottish Gaelic (in Roman characters) adapted from William Bedell's Classical Gaelic translation of the Old Testament and William Daniel's of the New Testament, published in London 
 Hearth Tax abolished
 The whisky distillery at Ferintosh, Black Isle, becomes the first to operate legally

Births 
 April – William McGibbon, composer and violinist (died 1756)
 26 September – James Murray, 2nd Duke of Atholl, peer and politician (died 1764)
 Undated – William Drummond, 4th Viscount Strathallan, Jacobite army officer (died 1746)

Deaths 
 3 October – Robert Barclay, Quaker and writer (born 1648)

See also 
 Timeline of Scottish history

References 

 
Years of the 17th century in Scotland
1690s in Scotland